Major Peter Owen Edmunds (21 January 1959 in London – 24 September 2016) was a British Army officer and former royal equerry who became a leading dealmaker in the Russian telecoms industry. He was a co-founder of Peterstar, the first private telecoms operator in St. Petersburg.

Education
Owen Edmunds – his family name was always spelt unhyphenated – was educated at Harrow School and Durham University, where he completed a degree in Politics in 1981.

Career
In 1982, as a young officer in the 1st battalion of the Welsh Guards Owen Edmunds was part of the task force sent to recover the Falkland Islands after the Argentine invasion that April. While serving as a rifle platoon commander with No 3 Company he survived the bombing of the RFA Sir Galahad by enemy jets during the Battle of San Carlos, which killed 32 of his fellow Welsh Guardsmen. In the aftermath of the war he continued in the Welsh Guards as Intelligence Officer; a Temporary Equerry to Prince Charles in 1985, and then, from 1987, an Adjutant with the British Army of the Rhine in Bergen-Hohne, where he served under Christopher Drewry.

In 1988 he was selected for the BRIXMIS military liaison mission in Berlin. After two years of learning Russian and German and the technical skills training necessary to keep an eye on the Soviet Forces in East Germany, he arrived in Germany shortly before the Fall of the Berlin Wall. Tasked with shutting down the Mission House in Potsdam, he then served for a period as interpreter to Robert Corbett, the Commandant of the British Sector in Berlin.

Russia
In 1992 Owen Edmunds abruptly resigned from the British Army to take advantage of the opportunities offered by the liberalising Russian economy following perestroika. There, with others, he founded the mobile phone operator Peterstar, which he managed to get listed on the US Nasdaq – the first Russian company to do so. Their first licence was signed by the Mayor, Vladimir Putin, who Owen Edmunds recalled as being 'monosyllabic' and suspicious. During these years he was a valuable source for the business journalist Martin Vander Weyer. Chairman of Peterstar from 1999–2002, he later became an independent consultant, and in 2009 with fellow entrepreneur Garth Self, started Russian Towers, a company that constructs and operates mobile phone towers across Russia. By 2016 Self and Owen Edmunds owned the largest fleet of towers in the country.

Death
Owen Edmunds died of cancer on 24 September 2016, and was working on a business deal up to the day he died. He had been received into the Catholic Church two weeks earlier.

References

1959 births
2016 deaths
People educated at Harrow School
Welsh Guards officers
British expatriates in Russia
British Army personnel of the Falklands War
Alumni of Hatfield College, Durham
Converts to Roman Catholicism